Kolozs County was an administrative county (comitatus) of the Kingdom of Hungary, of the Eastern Hungarian Kingdom and of the Principality of Transylvania. Its territory is now in north-western Romania (north-western Transylvania). The capital of the county was Kolozsvár (present-day Cluj-Napoca).

Geography

After 1876, Kolozs County shared borders with the Hungarian counties Bihar, Szilágy, Szolnok-Doboka, Beszterce-Naszód, Maros-Torda, and Torda-Aranyos. The rivers Crișul Repede and Someșul Mic flowed through the county.

History
Kolozs County was formed in the 11th century. In 1876, when the administrative structure of Transylvania was changed, the territory of Kolozs was modified and some villages of Doboka County (which was then disbanded) were annexed to it. In 1920, by the Treaty of Trianon, the county became part of Romania. Following the Second Vienna Award, large part of it was retaken by Hungary in 1940 and the county was recreated; however, after World War II it became part of Romania again. Most of the territory of the county lies in the present Romanian county Cluj, some parts of the county are in the present Romanian counties Sălaj (north-west), Bistrița-Năsăud (north-east), and Mureș (south-east).

Demographics

Subdivisions

In the early 20th century, the subdivisions of Kolozs County were:

Notes

References 

Kingdom of Hungary counties in Transylvania
States and territories disestablished in 1920
States and territories established in 1940
States and territories disestablished in 1945
History of Cluj-Napoca